Maxim Biller (born 25 August 1960 in Prague, Czechoslovakia) is a German writer and columnist.

Born in Prague to Russian Jewish parents, he emigrated with his parents and sister to Germany in 1970, when he was ten years old. After living for a long time in Hamburg and Munich, he now lives in Berlin, frequently writing about issues relating to Jews and Germans.

In 2003 his novel Esra excited attention when its sale was prohibited shortly after its release. Two persons had a provisional order obtained, because they claimed to have seen themselves reflected in characters in the book. A German court obliged their request to take the book from circulation on these grounds.

His first works translated into English (by Anthea Bell) are the collection Love Today (2008), some of which appeared in The New Yorker.

Publications
Wenn ich einmal reich und tot bin: Erzählungen (Someday when I'm rich and dead: Narratives), Kiepenheuer & Witsch, Cologne 1990,  (including the narrative Harlem Holocaust)
Die Tempojahre: Essays und Reportagen, Deutscher Taschenbuch-Verlag, Munich 1991, 
Aufbruch nach Deutschland: Sechzehn Foto-Essays
Land der Väter und Verräter: Erzählungen, Kiepenheuer & Witsch, Cologne 1994, 
Harlem Holocaust (short novel), Kiepenheuer & Witsch, Cologne 1998, 
Die Tochter, Kiepenheuer & Witsch, Cologne 2000, 
Kühltransport, 2001
Deutschbuch, 2001
 Esra : Roman, 2003,  (distribution was prohibited from publishing by court)
Der perfekte Roman: Das Maxim-Biller-Lesebuch, 2003
Bernsteintage: Erzählungen, 2004
Maxim Biller Tapes (CD with songs and poems), 2004
I Love My Leid (video), 2004
Moralische Geschichten: Satirische Kurzgeschichten, Kiepenheuer & Witsch, Cologne 2005 
Adas größter Wunsch (children's book), 2005
Menschen in falschen Zusammenhängen (comedy), 2006
Liebe heute (short stories), 2007
Ein verrückter Vormittag (children's book), 2008
Der gebrauchte Jude (self-portrait), Kiepenheuer & Witsch, Cologne 2009, 
Kanalratten (theater play), Fischer 2013 
Im Kopf von Bruno Schulz: Novelle, Kiepenheuer & Witsch, Cologne 2013, 
Jack Happy (children's book), Atlantik, Hamburg 2014, 
Biografie: Roman, Kiepenheuer & Witsch, Cologne 2016,

Awards
1994 Toucan Prize from the city of Munich
1996 Preis des Europäischen Feuilletons: "Feuilleton" are the culture pages in German speaking newspaper
1996 
1999 Theodor Wolff Prize
2008  of University of Kassel
2012 Würth-Literaturpreis

References

1960 births
Czechoslovak emigrants to Germany
Czech people of Russian-Jewish descent
German people of Czech-Jewish descent
German people of Russian-Jewish descent
German male writers
Jewish Czech writers
Living people
Writers from Prague